Time Please  is a Marathi film released on 26 July 2013. This film  is directed by Sameer Vidwans and produced by Pratisaad Productions & 24 Carat Entertainment.

Cast 
Umesh Kamat as Hrushikesh Deshpande
Priya Bapat as Amruta Sane-Deshpande
Siddhartha Jadhav as Himmatrao Dhondepatil
Sai Tamhankar as Radhika Dabholkar
Vandana Gupte as Mandodari Kulkarni
Seema Deshpande as Shubhada Sane
Madhav Abhyankar

Synopsis 
Amruta, 24 is a bubbly girl who's married to Hrishi, 30, a matured man. She is lively and loud while he is composed and subtle. Just after the marriage they start to discover the differences between their liking, expressions and views. The real drama starts when Hrishi's colleague Radhika and Amruta's childhood buddy Himmatrao come in the picture.

Instantly the game of love, care, transparency and insecurities start. Undergoing this phase, they learn about their reactions. They understand how some small moments of truth, faith, anger and realization make huge differences to any relationship.

Soundtrack
The music has been directed by Hrishikesh Kamerkar, while the lyrics have been provided by Kshitij Patwardhan.

Track listing

References 

2013 films
2010s Marathi-language films